The Peasant Revolt in Albania, also known as the Islamic Revolt or Muslim Uprising in Albania, was an uprising of peasants from central Albania, mostly Muslims against the regime of Prince Wilhelm of Wied during 1914. It was one of the reasons for the prince's withdrawal from the country which marked the fall of the Principality of Albania. The uprising was led by Muslim leaders Haxhi Qamili, Arif Hiqmeti, Musa Qazimi and Mustafa Ndroqi. Along with a demand of total amnesty, the rebels required the return of Albania to the suzerainty of the Sultan of the Ottoman Empire.

Background 

Prince Wilhelm of Wied took the throne of Principality of Albania on March 7, 1914. Unfortunately, he immediately had to face a chaotic political situation, both within the country and with its neighbors. Based on the Treaty of London signed on May 30, 1913, the Great Powers resolved on July 29, 1913 that they should establish International gendarmerie to take care of public order and security on the territory of newly recognized Principality of Albania. On the same basis, they established International Commission of Control (ICC) on October 15, 1913, to take care of the administration of newly established Albania until its own political institutions were in order.

Prince Wilhelm of Wied had to handle a difficult political situation:
 Essad Pasha Toptani, who dominated the new government of the Principality of Albania, was both minister of interior and minister of war. By choosing to reside in Durres, instead of Shkodër, the prince of Wied was at the mercy of Essad Pasha.
 The International Commission of Control and foreign advisers still had a great deal of authority.
 There were representatives of both Austria-Hungary and Italy
 There was resistance in Northern Epirus, which was finally given a special administration, by Protocol of Corfu
 There was fighting between forces under control of Essad Pasha Toptani and the Provisional Government of Albania
 The major peasant revolt consisted mostly of pro-Ottoman Muslim peasants.

There were numerous armed groups in Principality of Albania during the regime of Prince Wilhelm:
 The International Gendarmerie was under the control of the International Commission of Control and Prince Wilhelm.
 The irregular bands of southerners were led by local leaders.
 The native outlaw
 The Bulgarian outlaw, Komitadjis
 The Greek rebels from the Northern Epirus
 The peasant rebels in central Albania
 Essad Pasha's gendarmerie
 The Romanian volunteers
 The Austro-Hungarian volunteers
 The volunteers from Kosovo led by Isa Boletini
 The Mirdita Catholic volunteers from the northern mountains under the command of Prênk Bibë Doda

Essad Pasha Toptani, as Minister of War and Interior, was against a peaceful solution to the problem with the Northern Epirote Declaration of Independence on February 28, 1914. Toptani opposed the International Commission of Control which believed that problems can be solved by diplomatic means. The prince and his cabinet accepted the proposals of Essad Pasha to decide for a military solution. In order to increase the military strength of the Principality of Albania, several thousand Italian rifles as well as Austrian machine guns and mountain guns were purchased and distributed to the (predominantly Muslim) population of the central Albania.

The rebellion was only tacitly supported by the Ottomans, who as a consequence of the Balkan Wars, were physically separated from the Albanian lands. The Ottoman preoccupation with the looming First World War also rendered diplomatic and material support impractical.

Events

The plot of pro-Ottoman Albanians 

A plot by the Young Turk government led by Bekir Fikri to restore Ottoman control over Albania through the installment of an Ottoman-Albanian officer, Ahmed Izzet Pasha, as monarch was uncovered by the Serbs and reported to the ICC. Ismail Qemali supported the plot for military assistance against Serbia and Greece. The ICC allowed their Dutch officers serving as the Albanian Gendarmerie to declare a state of emergency and stop the plot. They raided Vlorë on January 7-8, 1914, discovering more than 200 Ottoman troops and arrested Fikri. During Fikri's trial, the plot emerged and an ICC military court under Colonel Willem de Veer condemned him to death. His sentence was later commuted to life imprisonment, while Qemali and his cabinet resigned. After Qemali left the country, turmoil ensued throughout Albania. At that time, the Commission was not able to force Essad Pasha to leave Albania because it did not have enough authority.

Revolt 

The pro-Ottoman peasants believed that the new regime of the Principality of Albania was a tool of the 6 Christian Great Powers and the landowners that owned half of the arable land. The revolt was led by Muslim leaders Haxhi Qamili, Arif Hiqmeti, Musa Qazimi and Mustafa Ndroqi. This group of discontented Muslim clerics gathered around Essad Pasha Toptani who proclaimed himself the savior of Albania and Islam.

After receiving the news that thousands of rebels had surrounded Shijak on May 17 (only 10 km from Durres), Essad Pasha Toptani was accused of fomenting the revolt against William of Wied. Without trial, he was exiled to Italy on May 20. In Italy, he was received with honor, since both Italian and Austrian representatives played roles in intrigues that surrounded the revolt.

The chaos and revolts deteriorated after Essad Pasha was exiled. In order to gain support of the Mirdita, Catholic volunteers from the northern mountains, Prince of Wied appointed their leader, Prênk Bibë Doda, to be the foreign minister of the Principality of Albania. The International Dutch Gendarmerie was also joined by Isa Boletini and his men from Kosovo. Dutch gendarmes, together with northern Mirdita Catholics, attempted to capture Shijak, but when they engaged the rebels on May 23, they were surrounded and captured. It also happened to another expedition from Durres which attempted to release the captured gendarmes. Rebels launched the attack on Durres and even started firing with their light weapons. The people in Durres panicked and the Prince and his family had to find shelter on an Italian ship anchored in the bay.

On the same evening, the rebels released a Dutch officer and sent him to Prince of Wied with their demands:
 Total amnesty
 Return of Albania under suzerainty of sultan of Ottoman Empire

Prince of Wied then appointed, Colonel Thomson, to be commander of defense of Durrës. Thomson was killed on June 15 during a rebel attack. The next week, Dutch officers were captured by rebels in central Albania. The rebels captured Berat and Vlore on July 12 and August 21 without fight.

On August 14, the rebels attacked the capital, which was protected mainly by Romanian and Austrian volunteers. The first attack lasted 30 minutes and was repulsed with heavy losses. The second attack began after an hour before it was once again repulsed, mainly due to the brave actions of the Romanians who were greatly praised by their Christian Albanian comrades. After 30 minutes, the insurgents launched their third and final attack, but they were repelled by stiff Romanian resistance.

Only a week after Prince Wilhelm of Wied's departure from Durres on September 3, 1914, another violent revolt arose. The rebels laid siege on Durres, imprisoned Wied's supporters, called for the Muslim prince to establish the Senate of Central Albania. Insurgents hoisted the flag of the Ottoman Empire. The vast majority of population living in the northern and the southern part of Albania disassociated themselves from the Senate of Central Albania.

Haxhi Qamili and his supporters were reported to have bound, tortured and killed many teachers of the Albanian language. Because Qamili supported the usage of the Arabic alphabet (as opposed to the Latin one), he viewed them as enemies of Turkey.

The revolt failed to generate much support in the regions surrounding Elbasan, which were inhabited by a mix of Sunni, Bektashi, and Orthodox Albanians, with the Sunnis being the most numerous. The local Muslims were noted for their opposition to ideas deemed "fanatical" and their identification with Albanian nationalism. Much of this is attributed to the charismatic leadership of the Albanian nationalist Aqif Pasha. Local Islamic leaders also denounced the "archaic" ideas of Haxhi Qamili and supported the adoption of the Latin alphabet, contradicting much of the Sunni clergy elsewhere. The representative of Elbasan in Haxhi Qamili's uprising, Haxhi Feza, withdrew from the movement in protest against Haxhi Qamili's excesses, and for this, Haxhi Qamili personally ordered him to be imprisoned.

Aftermath 

Dutch officers were gradually replaced with officers from Austria-Hungary and Germany, who arrived in Durrës on July 4. Soon the First World War broke out and by August 4 most of Dutch officers returned to the Netherlands. In the autumn of 1914, Essad Pasha, decided to accept the invitation of Senate of the Central Albania to return to Albania to take over the power. 

First, he had to provide the financial backing for his government. Therefore, he travelled to Niš, Kingdom of Serbia, where he and Serbian Prime Minister Pašić, signed the secret treaty of Serbian-Albanian alliance on September 17, 1914. In October 1914, Essad Pasha returned to Albania. With Italian and Serbian financial backing, he established armed forces in Dibër and captured the interior of Albania which included Dures.

Atrocities 
During the revolt, the "disciplinary forces" of rebels headed by the mufti of Tirana, Musa Qazimi, carried out executions in order to "clean" the "Bektashi schismatics". The rebels, led by the fanatic Haxhi Qamili, burned down many Bektashi teqes from Martanesh in Bulqizë as far south as Berat, due to the strong links between Bektashism and Albanian nationalism and the religious differences between the Shi'ite-oriented Bektashis and the Sunni Muslim rebels.

Other targets besides "Bektashi schismatics" included Christians, Albanian nationalist teachers who had been teaching using the Latin alphabet, and even Muslim clerics who were supporters of Albanian nationhood.

See also 

 Wilhelm of Wied
 Principality of Albania
 Essad Pasha Toptani
 International Gendarmerie

References

External links 
 
 
 
 
 Colonel Thomson and Albania, Harrie Teunissen

Social history of Albania
1914 in Albania
Conflicts in 1914
Mass murder in 1914